The 2012–13 All-Ireland Junior Club Football Championship was the 12th staging of the All-Ireland Junior Club Football Championship since its establishment by the Gaelic Athletic Association.

The All-Ireland final was played on 24 February 2013 at Croke Park in Dublin, between Ballinasloe and Kenmare Shamrocks. Ballinasloe won the match by 0-14 to 0-10 to claim their first ever championship title.

All-Ireland Junior Club Football Championship

All-Ireland final

References

2012 in Irish sport
2013 in Irish sport
All-Ireland Junior Club Football Championship
All-Ireland Junior Club Football Championship